Anthaxia quadripunctata, the Metallic wood-boring beetle, is a species of jewel beetles belonging to the family Buprestidae, subfamily Buprestinae.

Subspecies
Anthaxia quadripunctata attavistica Obenberger, 1918 
Anthaxia quadripunctata quadripunctata (Linnaeus, 1758)

Description

The basic color is black or dark brown with a copper shine. The elytra and pronotum are grainy. Pronotum is almost rectangular and usually shows a row of four small dimples (hence the Latin name quadripunctata, meaning with four points).

Adults fly from April to September feeding on pollen of several Asteraceae and prefer white and yellow flowers, where frequently many of them are mating. Larvae are polyphagous wood borers, living just under the bark of sick or dead coniferous trees. Main larval host plants are in genus Picea, Abies, Juniperus, Larix and Pinus.

Distribution
This beetle is present in most of Europe, the eastern Palearctic realm, the Caucasus, Asia Minor, the Near East, and North Africa.

Habitat
They live in mountain areas with coniferous trees, especially in the forest edges.

References
 Biolib
 Fauna Europaea
 Commanster
 Coleo-net.de

External links
 Atlas of Beetles of Russia
 Anthaxia.eu

Buprestidae
Beetles of Europe
Beetles described in 1758
Taxa named by Carl Linnaeus